Pakistan International Airlines Flight 740 was a Hajj pilgrimage flight from Kano, Nigeria to Karachi, Pakistan with an intermediate stopover in Jeddah, Saudi Arabia. Operated by Pakistan International Airlines, on 26 November 1979, the Boeing 707-340C serving the route crashed shortly after takeoff from Jeddah International Airport. All 156 people on board were killed.

Aircraft 
The aircraft involved was a nine-year-old Boeing 707-340C with serial number 20275 and serial 844. It was built in 1970 and on July 30 made its first flight. Ten days later, on 10 August, it was delivered to Pakistan International Airlines (PIA) and was registered as AP-AWB. It was re-registered as AP-AWZ in 1972 after being leased for several months to another airline. The aircraft had 30,700 flight hours at the time of the crash.

Crash 
The airliner operated as flight 740 from Jeddah to Karachi, during which it carried pilgrims returning from the Hajj. There were a total of 156 people on board, 11 crew members and 145 passengers. The first warning of an emergency came at 01:47, 21 minutes after takeoff, when a flight attendant informed the pilots that a fire had started in the rear of the cabin. The pilot radioed a request to return to Jeddah because smoke was coming into the cabin and cockpit. At 02:03 the crew sent a distress signal. The Jeddah control tower heard the pilot shout "Mayday! Mayday!" before the radio went silent. After about a minute, the aircraft crashed into an area of rocks and exploded. The crash site was at an altitude of  located  North of the city of Taif. All 156 people on board died. The accident remains, to date, the third-deadliest plane crash on Saudi Arabian soil and the third-deadliest Boeing 707 crash.

Cause 
The cause of the accident was an in-flight fire in the cabin area, which, through its intensity and rapid extension, eventually incapacitated the flight crew. The cause of the cabin fire was not determined. The most likely version is that there was a gas leak or kerosene from one of the pilgrim's stoves. The fuel leakage may have been a result of the decrease in cabin pressure. A malfunction in the electrical circuits was also considered as an ignition source, but could not be confirmed because of the design of the aircraft's electrical systems and protection devices. Terrorism was ruled out as a cause, as there was no evidence that incendiary devices were used.

See also 
 Aviation safety
 List of accidents and incidents involving commercial aircraft

References

External links 

Airliner accidents and incidents caused by in-flight fires
Pakistan International Airlines accidents and incidents
Accidents and incidents involving the Boeing 707
Aviation accidents and incidents in Saudi Arabia
Aviation accidents and incidents in 1979
November 1979 events in Asia
1979 in Saudi Arabia
1979 in Pakistan
1979 disasters in Pakistan
1979 disasters in Saudi Arabia